Brachynotocoris is a genus of mostly European capsid bugs in the tribe Orthotylini, erected by Odo Reuter in 1880.  The type species Brachynotocoris puncticornis is found in northern Europe, including the British Isles.

Species 
According to BioLib the following are included:
 Brachynotocoris cyprius Wagner, 1961 - subspecies:
 B. cyprius cyprius Wagner, 1961
 B. cyprius eduardwagneri Pagola-Carte, 2010
 B. cyprius inermis Linnavuori, 1965
 Brachynotocoris parvinotum (Lindberg, 1940)
 Brachynotocoris puncticornis Reuter, 1880 - type species
 Brachynotocoris viticinus Seidenstücker, 1954

References

External links
Flikr image: Brachynotocoris puncticornis
 

Miridae genera
Hemiptera of Europe
Orthotylini